Rappers Rapp Records (also known as The Rappers Rapp Disco Record Co.) is an American record label founded in 1981 by Duffy Hook III and Jerry Hooks Sr. and the first West Coast rap label. It is currently run by Lee "DJ Flash" Johnson. The label's first release was the single "The Gigolo Rapp" by Disco Daddy & Captain Rapp in 1981. After the success of their first release, Hook began hosting auditions in Los Angeles and found their second act called The Rappers Rapp Group.

The Rappers Rap Group, which consisted of five L.A. rappers, MC Fosty, Lovin C, King MC, Macker-Moe, Mr Ice and DJ Flash from Taft, California, released their first single, "Rappers Rapp Theme", in 1982. One year later Rich Cason released "Year 2001 Boogie" on Rappers Rapp. With this record the style changed from the typical old school rap to an electronic wave sound with vocoders and rap. Rich Cason had a major influence on the release of "Magic Mike Theme", "Radio Activity Rapp", "Killer Groove" and "Bad Times (I Can't Stand It)". In 1986 The Brothers Supreme released the West Coast classic "We Can´t Be Held Back" on the Rappers Rapp Label.

Current artists
DJ Flash

Former artists

References

External links 
  Official website

See also 
 List of record labels

American hip hop record labels